Ravet may refer to:

Places

Ravet, Pune, a village near Pune, Maharashtra, India
Ravet, Raigarh, a village in Raigarh district, Maharashtra, India

People

Ward de Ravet, Belgian actor
Yoric Ravet, French footballer

Other
Ravet (river), a tributary of the river Aube, France.